The Calanque de Sormiou is the biggest calanque of the Calanques National Park, France. Located in the 9th arrondissement of Marseille, it is famous for its climbing spots. Access by car is restricted in the summer due to the risk of forest fires.

9th arrondissement of Marseille
Landforms of Provence-Alpes-Côte d'Azur
Cliffs of Metropolitan France
Massif des Calanques